Miguel Ángel Lotina Oruechebarría (born 18 June 1957) is a Spanish professional manager and former footballer who played as a striker.

His playing career was spent mostly with Logroñés, whom he represented in Segunda División, also playing for Castellón in La Liga.

In a managerial career of over three decades, Lotina led seven clubs in the top flight, starting with Logroñés. He won the Copa del Rey with Espanyol in 2006 and the UEFA Intertoto Cup with Deportivo in 2008. He later worked in Cyprus, Qatar and for four teams in Japan.

Playing career
Born in Meñaka, Biscay, Lotina started playing football with local Gernika Club, representing CD Castellón from 1981 to 1983. In his only season in La Liga he scored three goals in 21 games for the Valencians, who ranked 18th and last.

In summer 1983, Lotina signed with CD Logroñés. After netting 22 goals over two Segunda División seasons with the Riojan side – also representing them in Segunda División B – he contributed two in 14 matches in the 1986–87 campaign as the team promoted to the top flight for the first time ever, after finishing second to champions Valencia CF; he retired from the game in 1988 at the age of 31, without having appeared in the main division with his main club.

Coaching career

Early years
After starting coaching with Logroñés' reserves, Lotina managed the club in two separate stints in the 90s (12 games). In 1995–96, whilst in charge of CD Numancia, he helped the third-tier team reach the quarter-finals of the Copa del Rey after ousting top-flight sides Real Sociedad, Racing de Santander and Sporting de Gijón before bowing out to eventual finalists FC Barcelona 5–3 on aggregate.

After his debut in the top division with Logroñés in the 1996–97 season, being one of five managers as they finished in 22nd and last position, Lotina's next years were spent in division two with CD Badajoz, Numancia and CA Osasuna, helping the second promote to the top flight for the first time ever in 1999 and the third achieve the same feat the following year after a six-year absence. He remained with the Navarrese for two further campaigns, as they consecutively retained their status.

Celta
Lotina led RC Celta de Vigo to their first participation in the UEFA Champions League in 2002–03 as the Galicians finished fourth. The following season, however, even though the team progressed through the group stage by notably defeating A.C. Milan 2–1 at the San Siro, he was sacked after 21 rounds in an eventual relegation.

Espanyol and Real Sociedad
In 2004–05, Lotina coached RCD Espanyol to qualification to the UEFA Cup after finishing fifth. The year 2006 brought him his first football trophy, as the team won the domestic cup against Real Zaragoza (4–1) in the manager's second season. In the 2006–07 campaign, he returned to his native region after replacing the dismissed José Mari Bakero at the helm of 20th-placed Real Sociedad, but the Basques were relegated from the first division for the first time in 40 years after ranking second-bottom.

Deportivo
For 2007–08, Lotina returned to Galicia and joined Deportivo de La Coruña. After a poor start, he more often than not switched to a 5–3–2 formation, going on to finish the year comfortably placed in mid-table and reach the UEFA Intertoto Cup, where they won 3–1 on aggregate against Israel's Bnei Sakhnin F.C. in the final. 

Having advanced into the 2008–09 UEFA Cup, Lotina guided Deportivo through the group and expressed satisfaction at being drawn in the last 32 against Aalborg Boldspilklub of Denmark. The Scandinavians won home and away, eliminating his team 6–1 on aggregate. 

In March 2010, Lotina added one year to his contract that was set to expire. Depor were relegated in 2011 as the club also struggled financially; the club only managed to score nine goals away from home all year, being doomed in the last round after a 0–2 home loss against Valencia. On 23 May of that year, he announced his departure.

Villarreal
Lotina became Villarreal CF's third coach of the season on 19 March 2012, replacing José Francisco Molina following a 1–0 away defeat to Levante UD, with the team dangerously close to the relegation zone (17th), and eventually relegated as 18th, which meant that the reserves, which competed in the second tier, were also forced to drop down a level in June.

Abroad
On 21 June 2014, after a brief spell in the Cypriot First Division, Lotina was appointed head coach of newly promoted Qatar Stars League side Al-Shahania SC. Subsequently, he worked in Japan with Tokyo Verdy, Cerezo Osaka, Shimizu S-Pulse and Vissel Kobe.

Managerial statistics

Honours
Espanyol
Copa del Rey: 2005–06

Deportivo
UEFA Intertoto Cup: 2008

Notes

References

External links

1957 births
Living people
Spanish footballers
Footballers from the Basque Country (autonomous community)
Sportspeople from Biscay
Association football forwards
La Liga players
Segunda División players
Segunda División B players
Tercera División players
Gernika Club footballers
CD Logroñés footballers
CD Castellón footballers
Spanish football managers
La Liga managers
Segunda División managers
Segunda División B managers
Tercera División managers
CD Logroñés managers
CD Numancia managers
CD Badajoz managers
CA Osasuna managers
RC Celta de Vigo managers
RCD Espanyol managers
Real Sociedad managers
Deportivo de La Coruña managers
Villarreal CF managers
Cypriot First Division managers
AC Omonia managers
Qatar Stars League managers
Al-Shahania Sports Club managers
J1 League managers
J2 League managers
Tokyo Verdy managers
Cerezo Osaka managers
Shimizu S-Pulse managers
Vissel Kobe managers
Spanish expatriate football managers
Expatriate football managers in Cyprus
Expatriate football managers in Qatar
Expatriate football managers in Japan
Spanish expatriate sportspeople in Cyprus
Spanish expatriate sportspeople in Qatar
Spanish expatriate sportspeople in Japan